Ballerini is the first remix album from American country music singer Kelsea Ballerini. The album, released through Black River Entertainment on September 11, 2020, features songs from Kelsea, her third studio album, which were stripped down and re-recorded.

Background 
Jessica Nicholson of MusicRow stated that "Ballerini deconstructed each song and re-recorded everything with minimal accompaniment, instead focusing on letting each song’s melody and lyrics lead the way".

Critical reception

Joseph Hudak of Rolling Stone stated that "the Ballerini interpretation [of "Club"] emphasizes those notions of detachment and depression". Matthew Leimkuehler of The Tennessean stated that Ballerini "took to the studio to reimagine Kelsea, substituting dazzling pop layer each song for renditions rooted in unvarnished songwriting".

Track listing

Charts

Weekly charts

Year-end charts

References 

2020 albums
Kelsea Ballerini albums
Black River Entertainment albums
Pop albums by American artists
Albums produced by Jimmy Robbins